Ivan Štefanec (born 30 September 1961 in Považská Bystrica) is a Slovak politician and business manager, former member of the Slovak Parliament and current member of the European Parliament for Christian Democratic Movement.

Early life and education 
Ivan Štefanec was born in Považská Bystrica, Slovakia. After finishing high school in 1979, he studied at the University of Economics in Bratislava studying Economic Mathematics from 1979 to 1983. He later supplemented his studies with a postgraduate study of the English language at Comenius University in Bratislava (1987–1989). After the events of November 1989, he was one of the first Czechoslovak students to use the opportunity to study abroad and became a successful graduate of the first MBA program for managers in Central and Eastern Europe with a diploma from the Rochester Institute of Technology in New York (1991–1992). Among many reputable professors, he was taught by Douglass North, who won the Nobel Prize in Economics in 1993. In the year 1994, Ivan Štefanec finished his scientific postgraduate studies at the University of Economics in Bratislava, Faculty of Business and Informatics in Bratislava.

Career 
Ivan Štefanec started working as a researcher and later as a project manager at the engineering plant Považské Strojárne, Považská Bystrica in 1983. From 1992 to1993 he worked as the branch manager of Ernst & Young CS Consulting and since 1994 his professional career was intertwined with the company Coca-Cola. He started as chief financial officer and deputy general manager and successfully ran the company Coca-Cola Beverages Slovakia as the general manager for 5 years. Under his leadership, Coca-Cola Beverages Slovakia was awarded with the National Quality Prize 2001. Following this and other accomplishments Ivan Štefanec was appointed the EU integration manager of Coca-Cola HBC in Vienna in January 2003. This role, among other responsibilities, incorporated the preparation of the company for EU Enlargement in all accessible countries. Ivan Štefanec was also the president of the Business Alliance of Slovakia from when it was founded in 2001 until 2005.

Political career

Career in national politics
In 2003, Štefanec was nominated for the position of European Commissioner by the Slovak Democratic and Christian Union. After the 2004 wind disaster in the High Tatra Mountains, Ivan Štefanec led the Government Committee for the recovery and development of the High Tatras. In 2006, he was appointed as the Plenipotentiary for adoption of the Euro in Slovakia. From 2006 – 2010 and 2010 – 2014 he was a member of the Slovak National Council. He focused specifically on Economic issues and European affairs. Moreover, he was active in the area of SMEs, entrepreneurship and Slovak/Taiwanese relations. In 2010 he was appointed the chairman of the Parliamentary Committee on European Affairs. On 19 February 2015 Ivan Štefanec left the SDKÚ-DS party claiming that the party has ceased to function. He has been a member of the Slovak political party KDH (Christian Democratic Movement) since November 2015.

With respect to international relations, his main actions include:

 Supporting Slovak national conventions of the EU- Moldova, Ukraine, Montenegro- help enforcing the European agenda and creating a civil society
 Visiting Kazakhstan and Kyrgyzstan- on the basis of an invitation from the National Democratic Institute, he participated in a lecture tour and meetings with members of the parliament about democracy and transparency
 Visiting Kosovo- on the basis of an invitation from the British Council, he led a parliamentary delegation made up of representatives from each party as well as the president herself, the President of the Parliament and members of the government with the goal of developing non-diplomatic relations
 Visiting Taiwan- as the delegation leader, he participated in meetings with representatives of the government and parliamentary representatives, while the goal of the meeting was the development of treaties concerning the support of small businesses and the support of science and technology parks

In cooperation with the Taiwanese government, he has credit for the sponsorship of:

 Computer technology and teaching aids for schools in Bratislava, Považská Bystrica, and Kozarovce
 Health equipment for Mýtna Clinic and the Faculty hospital of Bratislava
 WiFi access on both sides of the Dunaj River in Bratislava
 The house of the Third Age in Bratislava-Petržalka
 An orphanage in Modra-Harmónia

Member of the European Parliament, 2014–present
At the 2014 European Parliamentary election Štefanec was elected a member of the European Parliament for the SDKÚ-DS and subsequently joined the EPP Group. His priority topics are the Digital Single Market, SMEs, employment, and red tape reduction.

Currently, Štefanec serves as a member of the Committee on the Internal Market and Consumer Protection, the Delegation for relations with Japan and a substitute in the Committee on Industry, Research, and Energy, the Special Committee on Artificial Intelligence in the Digital Age, the Delegation to the EU-Ukraine Parliamentary Association Committee, and the Subcommittee on Human Rights. From 2016 until 2017, Štefanec was a member of the temporary Committee of Inquiry into Emission Measurements in the Automotive Sector.

In addition, Štefanec holds the position of the President of SME Europe and is the European Investment Fund Programming Committee Co-chair. Since 2019, he has been the president of the Beer Club President. He is also a member of the European Internet Forum; the European Parliament Intergroup on Integrity (Transparency, Anti-Corruption and Organized Crime); and the European Parliament Intergroup on Disability.

In his previous term, Štefanec was a member of the Committee on the Internal Market and Consumer Protection, the Delegation for relations with the countries of South Asia, and the Committee of Inquiry into Emission Measurements in the Automotive Sector. He served as a substitute for the Committee on Budgets, the Delegation to the EU-Ukraine Parliamentary Association Committee, the Delegation to the Euronest Parliamentary Assembly, the Subcommittee on Human Rights, the Committee of Inquiry to investigate alleged contraventions and maladministration in the application of Union law in relation to money laundering, tax avoidance, and tax evasion, and the Special Committee on financial crimes, tax evasion, and tax avoidance.

Recognition
 2003 – Dale Carnegie Leadership Award
 2011 – Taiwanese  Friendship Medal of Diplomacy

Results and Awards 
As a part of his scientific work, Štefanec studied multicriteria optimization. In the past few years, he has regularly presented on the topics of strategic management, international business, and introducing the Euro at international conferences as well as Slovak and foreign universities.

Among his social activities, he is the co-founder of the Slovak Soft Drinks and Mineral Waters Association and from the year 1992 to 2004, he served as the chairman of the board. He also served as the Chairman of the MBA Advisory Board for Comenius University in Bratislava. On the international level, from 1997, he represented Slovakia as a Member of the Committee for the Enlargement of the European Union at the international organization for the production of soft drinks, UNESDA/CISDA with its base in Brussels. From 2000 to 2004, he served as the organization's president. In the year 2001, he was one of the founding members of the Business Alliance of Slovakia (PAS) and its first president until the year 2005. He is currently the president of PAS and in this role, is primarily focused on protecting the interests and voices of small businesses and improving the ethics associated with the business. Between the years 2004 and 2006, he also worked as the Vice President of the National Union of Employers, responsible for the union's international relations. Since 2004, he has been the President of the SME Union Slovakia. Štefanec served as the Head of the Slovakia-Taiwan Chamber of Commerce, through which he enabled the creation of new work opportunities by attracting new investors like Au Optronics, Foxconn, and Delta as well as promoting Slovak entrepreneurs in Taiwan.

For his economic results and for the techniques with which he led firms, he received the National Prize for Quality in 2001. In the same year, he was awarded the title of Notable Economist from the Economic Club- an independent economic forum for the development of the entrepreneurial environment. For the exceptional results he enabled in his mobilization of human capital, innovative perspective, and community development, he was awarded the Dale Carnegie Leadership Award in 2003. He was the first Slovakian to be given this notable award. In 2011, he received the Friendship Medal of Diplomacy from the Taiwanese government for his international activities and development and Slovak-Taiwanese relations.

Personal life 
Štefanec has been married for 37 years to his wife Magdalena who is an economic engineer. Together they have two children, daughter Ivana and son Vladislav. He also now has two grandchildren.

References

External links 
Official Website 
Profile at the European Parliament Website

1961 births
Living people
Sportspeople from Považská Bystrica
Comenius University alumni
Rochester Institute of Technology alumni
Members of the National Council (Slovakia) 2006-2010
Members of the National Council (Slovakia) 2010-2012
Members of the National Council (Slovakia) 2012-2016
Slovak Democratic and Christian Union – Democratic Party politicians
Slovak Democratic and Christian Union – Democratic Party MEPs
MEPs for Slovakia 2014–2019
MEPs for Slovakia 2019–2024